Asahi (or Asahi Health) is a Finnish health exercise based on the eastern traditions of T'ai chi ch'uan, qigong, yiquan and yoga, with a western scientific viewpoint. Asahi is designed to suit everybody, regardless of physical condition or age and education level. 

Asahi exercise is taught and performed in instructed groups, but Asahi can also be performed alone as a form of daily self-treatment and build. Asahi exercise is ideal for short breaks. This exercise is equally effective in a group or alone as pleases.

The History of Asahi

Asahi was created  in Finland 2004 by professional sports instructors and martial artists Timo Klemola, Ilpo Jalamo, Keijo Mikkonen and Yrjö Mähönen. They all had high regards towards classical body development techniques such as karate, T'ai chi ch'uan, yiquan and yoga, but these styles, as rewarding as they are, seemed to attract only a small marginal of the Finnish population. 

These classical styles are quite complex and therefore may have a high starting level. They use concepts such as qi and prana, which may seem mystical to western people.

The purpose of Asahi was to get the best out of these techniques, put it in the most simplified form, make it overall scientific and turn it into an easily approachable form - a health exercise for everybody with no starting level at all. 

Asahi is designed to treat and prevent shoulder- and back problems, fractures due to falling down and stress-related psychosomatic problems.

The Principles of Asahi

Asahi is a series of slow movements, completed in silence. It looks harmonious and beautiful, a bit like qigong.

The basic six principles of Asahi are:

1. The linking of movement and breath
2. Practicing vertically erect body alignment
3. Whole body movement
4. Listening to the slow motion
5. Cultivating the mind with mental images
6. The exercise as a continual, flowing experience

The Asahi movements are soft and performed in the rhythm of breathing. The series is simple and easy to learn. The movements have also a practical function, for example picking up a ball from the floor or improving one’s balance by standing on one foot. Advanced levels are designed for long-term trainees, yet they are equally simple to learn.

Distribution
Asahi can be practiced in major areas of Finland. Asahi Health Ltd has also been accepted as an Education Partner to Federation of International Sports, Aerobics and Fitness as the first Body Mind -product to be recognized and recommended by this organization. These exercises can be done by a teacher guiding a class, or through video instruction.

See also

Qigong
Yiquan
T'ai chi ch'uan
Yoga
Federation of International Sports, Aerobics and Fitness

References

Further reading 
 Ilpo Jalamo, Timo Klemola, Keijo Mikkonen, Yrjö Mähönen: "Asahi - terveysliikuntaa kaikille." Edita Publishing Oy, 2007. ,

External links
Asahi Health Homepage

Meditation
Mind–body interventions
Physical exercise